Following are the results of the 2013–14 Serbian League Vojvodina season.  The Serbian League Vojvodina is a section of the Serbian League, Serbia's third football league. Teams from Vojvodina are in this section of the league. The other sections are Serbian League East, Serbian League West, and Serbian League Belgrade.

Teams
 FK Banat Zrenjanin
 FK Bačka 1901
 FK Bačka Bačka Palanka
 FK ČSK Pivara
 FK Dinamo Pančevo
 FK Dunav Stari Banovci
 FK Jedinstvo Novi Bečej
 FK Novi Sad
 FK Palić
 FK Radnički Nova Pazova
 FK Radnički Sombor
 FK Radnički Sremska Mitrovica
 FK Radnički Šid
 FK Senta
 FK Sloga Temerin
 FK Tekstilac Odžaci

League table

External links
 Football Association of Vojvodina - Official Site

Serbian League Vojvodina seasons
3
Serb